The 1999 Liga Sudamericana de Básquetbol, or 1999 FIBA South American League, was the fourth edition of the second-tier tournament for professional basketball clubs from South America. The tournament began on 9 February 1999 and finished on 30 March 1999. Brazilian team Vasco da Gama won the tournament, defeating Argentine club Boca Juniors in the Grand Finals, and qualified to the 1999 McDonald's Championship.

Format
Teams were split into one group of four teams and three teams of three teams each, and played each other in a round-robin format. The top two teams from each group advanced to the final stage, a best-of-three direct playoff elimination where the champion was decided. Unlike the previous tournaments where teams played home and away matches in the group phase, every group played all their matches in the same city.

Teams

Group stage

Group A
All games in group A were played in Cochabamba, Bolivia.

Group B
All games in group B were played in Valencia, Venezuela.

Group C
All games in group C were played in Rio de Janeiro, Brazil.

Group D
All games in group D were played in Cúcuta, Colombia.

Final stage

Quarterfinals

Game 1

Game 2

Game 3

Semifinals

Game 1

Game 2

Game 3

Grand Finals

Finals rosters
Vasco da Gama: Charles Byrd, Demétrius Conrado Ferraciú, Rogério Klafke, Jose Mingão, Jose Vargas - Janjão. 
Coach: Flor Meléndez 

Boca Juniors: Alejandro Montecchia, Gabriel Fernández, Stacey Williams, Rubén Wolkowyski, Rowan Barrett - Esteban de la Fuente, Daniel Farabello. Coach: Néstor "Che" Garcia 

Season MVP: Charles Byrd

References

Liga Sudamericana
1999